Different Light is the second studio album by American pop rock band the Bangles, released in January 1986. The album's Top 40 sound was a departure from their earlier 1960s-style rock'n'roll sound. It is their most successful album, reaching number two on the Billboard 200 and producing five charting singles, including the Billboard top two hits "Manic Monday" and "Walk Like an Egyptian". It is also the first album in which bassist Michael Steele sings lead vocals on some tracks.

The 2008 reissue CD on the Wounded Bird Records label (WOU 4039) adds a bonus track: "Walk Like an Egyptian (Extended Dance Mix)".

Singles
Different Light produced five singles, the first three of which were written by someone other than the Bangles. Lead single "Manic Monday", originally written by Prince under the pseudonym "Christopher" in 1984 as a duet for the Apollonia 6 album, peaked at number two in the United Kingdom and the United States in 1986. "If She Knew What She Wants", the second single from Different Light, was originally recorded by Jules Shear on his 1985 Eternal Return album. The song was originally written in the first person, however the Bangles rewrote the lyrics in the third person as they considered it more appropriate; their version charted at number 29 in the United States and number 31 in the United Kingdom. "Walk Like an Egyptian" was written by Liam Sternberg after seeing people on a ferry walking awkwardly to keep their balance as figures do in Ancient Egyptian reliefs; it became one of the most successful singles by the Bangles, hitting number one in the United States, Denmark, and the Netherlands, as well as peaking at number three in the United Kingdom. "Walking Down Your Street" hit number 11 in the United States and number 16 in the United Kingdom, and a fifth single, "Following", was released exclusively in the latter country.

Album cover variations
The covers of the most of the album's cassette pressings and the sheet music songbook only show 12 (out of 16) of the "different" snapshots, eliminating the third column to best fit the rectangular layout of cassette cases and book.

The back cover of European-made CDs replicates the back cover of the vinyl LP edition, with all 16 snapshots and the track index at the top. The back cover of the US version, however, only shows the first column of four snapshots, with the track index list occupying the rest of the space – a rare deviation for Columbia's CD issues during the 1980s.

Critical reception

Rolling Stone critic Laura Fissinger wrote that Different Light finds the Bangles "using less hook-happy song structure and more modernized production" than on their 1984 debut All Over the Place, "covering their roots without burying them ten feet under." She disagreed with objections to the more "deliberate, sophisticated and airwaves ready" nature of the production and felt that the album "puts then and now in significantly better balance", while also finding that the band had advanced "past the fan-apes-idol phase" in their musicianship.

In 2012, Slant Magazine ranked Different Light at number 78 on its list of the best albums of the 1980s.

Track listing

Personnel
The Bangles
 Susanna Hoffs – lead and backing vocals, guitars
 Vicki Peterson – lead and backing vocals, guitars
 Michael Steele – lead and backing vocals, guitars, bass
 Debbi Peterson – lead and backing vocals, drums, percussion
Additional musicians
 Rusty Anderson – additional guitars
 Barbara Chapman – harp, additional guitars
 Mitchell Froom – keyboards
 David Kahne – keyboards
 Carlos Vega – additional drums
 William Jones – electric sitar (uncredited)

Production
 Producer – David Kahne
 Engineers – Tchad Blake and Peggy McLeonard
 Assistant Engineers – David Glover and Mike Kloster
 Mixing – David Leonard
 Art Direction – Nancy Donald and Tony Lane
 Photography – Raul Vega
 Wardrobe - Genny Schorr and Tony Riviera

Charts

Weekly charts

Year-end charts

Certifications

References

Bibliography

External links
The Bangles official website

1986 albums
The Bangles albums
Albums produced by David Kahne
Columbia Records albums
Liberation Records albums